René Enríquez (November 24, 1933 – March 23, 1990) was a Nicaraguan-born American television actor of the 1970s and 1980s. He is best remembered for his role as Lt. Ray Calletano in the long-running television series Hill Street Blues (1981–1987).

He died on March 23, 1990, from AIDS, the first of two Hill Street Blues stars to die that year. Kiel Martin succumbed to lung cancer on December 28.

Co-star Daniel J. Travanti reminisced that, during his time on Hill Street Blues, Enríquez was "sad, unhappy because they were not thrilled with him, they kept saying that it was difficult to understand him. He was really crushed when they let him go. ... He was sweet, sweet natured and grateful for what he had there but saddened by being let go.

Original reports said Enríquez died of pancreatic cancer. However, upon publication of his death certificate, Enríquez's cause of death was revealed to be complications resulting from AIDS. As reported on a 1992 episode of Entertainment Tonight, this was not a surprise to his Hill Street Blues costar Charles Haid, as Enríquez had disclosed to Haid the true nature of his affliction.

Partial filmography
Girl of the Night (1960) – Ricardo
Bananas (1971) – Diaz 
Serpico (1973) – Cervantes Teacher (uncredited)
Harry and Tonto (1974) – Grocery Clerk
Night Moves (1975) – (voice, uncredited)
Blood Bath (1976)
The Great American Traffic Jam (1980, television film) - Mayor Julio Escontrerez
Under Fire (1983) – President Anastasio Somoza
Choices of the Heart (1983, television film) - Archbishop Oscar Romero
The Evil That Men Do (1984) – Max
Dream West (TV Mini-series 1986) – General Castro
Hill Street Blues (1981–1987, TV series) – Lt. Ray Calletano / Captain Ray Calletano
Bulletproof (1988) – Gen. Maximiliano Brogado

References

External links
 
 

1933 births
1990 deaths
Nicaraguan emigrants to the United States
American male film actors
American male television actors
AIDS-related deaths in California
20th-century American male actors